Karl Åke Edvard Grönberg (26 March 1914 – 15 September 1969) was a Swedish film actor who appeared in nearly 100 films. Grönberg was a versatile stage personality of his day, performing as a singer, variety artist, actor, in musical shows and in dramatic productions. He was born in Stockholm, Sweden and died of a heart attack in 1969.

Selected filmography

 65, 66 and I (1936) - Castle guard (uncredited)
 Russian Flu (1937) - Åhörare i studentmössa (uncredited)
 Klart till drabbning (1937) - Waiter (uncredited)
 Comrades in Uniform (1938) - Bonzo (uncredited)
 Thunder and Lightning (1938) - Chucker-out (uncredited)
 Med folket för fosterlandet (1938) - Printing clerk (uncredited)
 Just a Bugler (1938) - Ensign musician (uncredited)
 Only One Night (1939) - Young Man (uncredited)
 Adolf i eld och lågor (1939) - Photographer (uncredited)
 Hennes lilla majestät (1939) - Fighter (uncredited)
 Melodin från Gamla Stan (1939) - Andersson
 We at Solglantan (1939) - Svensson
 Kronans käcka gossar (1940) - 55 Lasse Björk
 Heroes in Yellow and Blue (1940) - Soldier (uncredited)
 Karusellen går... (1940) - Carnival Guard
 Alle man på post (1940) - Landgren
 Beredskapspojkar (1940) - Manne Melin
 Söderpojkar (1941) - Tjabo
 Woman on Board (1941) - Andersson
 Vårat gäng (1942) - Jonne
 En sjöman i frack (1942) - Alling
 En trallande jänta (1942) - Oscar
 Tomorrow's Melody (1942) - Manager at record department
 The Yellow Clinic (1942) - Herman Karlsson
 Rospiggar (1942) - Gurra
 Take Care of Ulla (1942) - Bigge Berglund
 Nothing Is Forgotten (1942) - Blommen
 Halta Lottas krog (1942) - Åke
 Kvinnan tar befälet (1942) - Holger Bastberg
 I brist på bevis (1943) - Jerker
 Captured by a Voice (1943) - Nicke Blom
 The Sin of Anna Lans (1943) - Axel
 Young Blood (1943) - Gustaf Johansson
 Sonja (1943) - Kurt Larsson
 Count Only the Happy Moments (1944) - Sven Bergling
 Se opp för spioner! (1944) - Sluggo
 Maria of Kvarngarden (1945) - Jakob
 Flickor i hamn (1945) - Axel
 I Roslagens famn (1945) - Frithiof Andersson
 The Girls in Smaland (1945) - Gunnar
 Brita in the Merchant's House (1946) - Arvid
 Stiliga Augusta (1946) - Forceland
 Between Brothers (1946) - Bengtsson, driver
 Song of Stockholm (1947) - Åke
 Woman Without a Face (1947) - Sam Svensson
 The Night Watchman's Wife (1947) - Gunnar Eklund
 Rail Workers (1947) - Calle-Ville
 Each to His Own Way (1948) - Gösta Sund
 Life Starts Now (1948) - Berra
 Dangerous Spring (1949) - Kalle Larsson
 Restaurant Intim (1950) - Kalle Söderberg
 Påhittiga Johansson (1950) - Påhittiga Johansson
 The Kiss on the Cruise (1950) - Knutte Glans
 Beef and the Banana (1951) - Biffen
 Skipper in Stormy Weather (1951) - Singer
 Livat på luckan (1951) - Conscript / 55 Lasse Björk
 Blondie, Beef and the Banana (1952) - Biffen Johansson
 She Came Like the Wind (1952) - Fabian Rosander
 Summer with Monika (1953) - Verkmästaren, Harrys arbetskamrat
 Folket i fält (1953) - Sven Pettersson
 Barabbas (1953) - Armful Watchman at Rome
 We Three Debutantes (1953) - Swedish John
 Sawdust and Tinsel (1953) - Albert Johansson
 Flottans glada gossar (1954) - Eskil Bladh
 Sju svarta be-hå (1954) - Sture Kaxe
 Aldrig med min kofot eller... Drömtjuven (1954) - Knutte Modig
 Storm Over Tjurö (1954) - Reinhold Karlsson
 A Lesson in Love (1954) - Carl-Adam
 Brudar och bollar (1954) - Wille Svensson
 Simon the Sinner (1954) - Lund
 Herr Arnes penningar (1954) - Innkeeper
 The Vicious Breed (1954) - House Owner
 Far och flyg (1955) - Hagfors
 Karusellen i fjällen (1955) - Porter
 Friarannonsen (1955) - Patron Berg
 Paradise (1955) - Betil Karlsson
 Luffaren och Rasmus (1955) - Paradis-Oskar
 The Hard Game (1956) - Andy Ekström
 Encounters in the Twilight (1957) - Roffe Sköld
 Klarar Bananen Biffen? (1957) - Biffen
 Line Six (1958) - Charlie
 Space Invasion of Lapland (1959) - Dr. Henrik
 91:an Karlsson muckar (tror han) (1959) - Doctor
 Pirates on the Malonen (1959) - Frasse Flinta
 Adam och Eva (1963) - Rulle
 Min kära är en ros (1963) - Edling
 491 (1964) - Reverend Mild
 Loving Couples (1964) - The fat man
 Ett sommaräventyr (1965) - Erik's father
 Hej du glada sommar!!! (1965) - Valle Väster
 Kråkguldet (1969, TV Series) - Gustav Lagerström (final appearance)

Discography
AKE GRONBERG  by Ake Gronberg. (U.S.A. Cadence Records #CLP 5002)

References

External links

1914 births
1969 deaths
Male actors from Stockholm
Swedish male film actors
Swedish male television actors
Swedish male stage actors
Swedish male musical theatre actors
20th-century Swedish male actors
20th-century Swedish male singers